Dykes Alexander (1724 – 10 April 1786, Needham Market) was a Suffolk banker active in the Quaker congregation there. He founded the bank of Alexander & Co in Needham Market in 1744.

Family life

Dykes married Martha Biddle, on 18 December, 1747 in Kingston upon Thames. She became a Quaker minister in about 1750 and remained active as such until her death in 1775. She was daughter of John and Abigail Biddle, quakers in Esher, Surrey. They had nine children:
 Samuel Alexander: 7 October 1749: 
 Martha
 7 February, 1760, Mary
 Sarah
 14 July 1763: Dykes
 William
 Abigail
 3 January 1768: William
 Ann

References

1724 births
1786 deaths
English bankers
English Quakers